The Director of Public Prosecutions of Hong Kong (DPP) is a law officer and head of the Prosecutions Division of the Department of Justice; the director is responsible for directing the conduct of trials and appeals on behalf of Hong Kong, providing legal advice to law enforcement agencies (such as Hong Kong Police, Hong Kong Customs and Excise, and ICAC), exercising the discretion of whether to institute criminal proceedings, and providing advice to others in government on proposed changes to the criminal law.

Former directors include David Leung SC, a lifelong prosecutor who joined the Prosecutions Division in 1995; he was appointed director in 2017. Leung resigned on 31 July 2020, citing differences with Secretary for Justice Teresa Cheng, leaving the post at the end of the year.

The current director is Maggie Yang Mei-kei. She was appointed director on 13 August 2021 and is the first woman and non-Queen's Counsel to be appointed director.

Crown prosecutors 
Prior to 1997, the position was known as the Crown Prosecutor. First appointed in 1979, there have been seven different Crown Prosecutors between 1979 and 1997. A list of former Crown Prosecutors is as follows:

 David Boy, QC (1979–1982)
 Max Lucas, QC (1982–1984)
 Joseph Duffy, QC (1984–1986)
 James Findlay, QC (1986–1989)
 Anthony Duckett, QC (Acting, 1989–1990)
 John Wood, CB (1990–1994)
 Peter Nguyen, QC (1994–1997)

Role of the director 
The Director may be appointed from a wide range of candidates, as long as they have been called to the Hong Kong Bar; they can be either in private practice or serving in the government, and may be of any nationality. The longest serving Director, Ian Grenville Cross QC SC, was a British career prosecutor, while the first Hong Kong Chinese Director Keith Yeung SC was an eminent criminal Senior Counsel in private practice.

As the head of the Prosecutions Division, the Director may or may not choose to be actively involved in court hearings. For example, while Keith Yeung was primarily known for directing overall policy and was rarely in court, David Leung was known to be actively involved and was often seen in court.

Independence of the director 
The Secretary for Justice, a politically appointed role, is the chief prosecutor and ultimately can direct the Director on criminal prosecution matters. This has come under fire from a number of legal experts in Hong Kong, including former prosecutor Ian Grenville Cross QC SC, eminent criminal defense lawyer Cheng Huan QC SC, barrister and legal sector legislator Dennis Kwok, as well as the South China Morning Post (in an editorial). Cross has argued that Hong Kong should follow the United Kingdom, where the Attorney General for England and Wales transferred criminal prosecuting powers to the UK's Director in 2009.

Retirement 
Director's are required to retire at age 60, and may return to private practice. Traditionally, however, outgoing Director's are offered the chance of a High Court judgeship; Director's appointed to the High Court must go through a six-month "cooling-off" period, in which they are kept out of any criminal trials, civil cases, or appeals involving the government. To date, Cross remains the only Director not to become a High Court judge post-retirement, but whether this was due to his own personal choice or the fact that a position was not offered to him is unclear.

List of directors 

The incumbent Director is an unofficial Justice of the Peace, and is given the "JP" designation while in office; this designation is removed upon leaving office, unless officially appointed separately.

List of current senior counsel prosecutors 
In order to reduce reliance on costly external Senior Counsel prosecutors, the Department of Justice has been trying to groom in house prosecutors to achieve Senior Counsel status; the following is a list of current Senior Counsel prosecutors:

 William Tam Yiu-ho, SC (2015): Deputy Director of Public Prosecutions (Policy and Administration) and Chief of Staff
Vinci Lam Wing-sai, SC (2021): Deputy Director of Public Prosecutions (Commercial Crime)

List of former senior counsel prosecutors 
The following is a list of former prosecutors who were appointed Senior Counsel during their tenure with the Department (since 1997 onwards); the year of elevation is indicated in brackets.

 John Reading, SC (1999): Entered private practice with Pacific Chambers
Michael Blanchflower, SC (2001): Entered private practice with Parkside Chambers
Arthur Luk, SC (2002): Entered private practice with Cheng Huan SC Chambers
Kevin Zervos, SC (2003): Appointed Judge of the Court of First Instance
Ian McWalters, SC (2005): Appointed a Judge of the Court of First Instance
Robert Lee, SC (2008): Entered private practice with Cheng Huan SC Chambers
Simon Tam, SC (2013): Retired
 Wesley Wong, SC (2013): Appointed Solicitor General
 Martin Hui, SC (2015): Entered private practice with Plowman Chambers
David Leung, SC (2015): Entered private practice with Liberty Chambers
 Anna Lai, SC (2016): Entered private practice with Plowman Chambers

References 

Prosecution
Law enforcement agencies of Hong Kong